William Samuel Fyffe (7 September 1914 – 15 April 1989) was a unionist politician in Northern Ireland.

Born on Gourlieville Terrace in Strabane, Fyffe was the son of Wilson Fyffe, a Solicitors Clerk, and Margaret Cochrane. Fyffe worked as a journalist and became active in the Ulster Unionist Party.  He was the Chairman of the North West Cricket Union, and was known for his strident opposition to civil rights marches.

Fyffe was narrowly elected in North Tyrone at the 1969 Northern Ireland general election, serving until the Parliament was prorogued in 1972.

References

1914 births
1989 deaths
Journalists from Northern Ireland
Members of the House of Commons of Northern Ireland 1969–1973
People from Strabane
Ulster Unionist Party members of the House of Commons of Northern Ireland
Members of the House of Commons of Northern Ireland for County Tyrone constituencies